Holon Toto Hall is an indoor arena that is located in the Tel Aviv District city of Holon, Israel. The arena is mainly used to host basketball games. It has a seating capacity of 5,500.

History
Holon Toto Hall was opened in March 2015. In 2016, the arena hosted the Rhythmic Gymnastics European Championships. The arena has been used as the home arena of the Israeli Basketball Super League club Hapoel Holon.

Gallery

See also
 List of indoor arenas in Israel

References

External links

Holon Arena at GAB Architects

Basketball venues in Israel
Indoor arenas in Israel
Sport in Holon
Sports venues in Tel Aviv District